For other uses, see Issue.

Issue is a digital publishing company that allows users to create digital magazines.

History
The company was founded in 2012 by Taylor Luk, through the AngelPad that offers seed funding and three months of mentorship. The founder had previously started a popular online lyrics site LyricsTime.

The initial idea originated from Shop2, a social shopping site developed by Taylor Luk, Mark Guo and Khoa Nguyen. The company was later reincorporated as Issue, Inc. in June 2013.

Issue received investments from AngelPad, Syd.Ventures and funding from Mondelēz International in their "Mobile Futures Australia", In the program Mondelez partnered with Mobile Marketing startups to help build the future of in-store and mobile engagement.

Business overview 

Issue offers a software as a service publishing for users to produce digital magazines on mobile devices. The company operates in California and Sydney with a development team based in Sydney, Australia.

Issue's client base includes brand marketers such as Mondelez, e-commerce companies Minkpink and Top3 by Design. These companies can publish Mobile content that is distributed through Issue App in the Apple App Store (iOS) and their own media channels such as social networking sites and mailing list.

Issue platform 
Issue allows users to create their own digital magazines via a web interface.

Issue Magazine Format: A Mobile publishing format that contains HTML5 pages with a proprietary CSS framework, Metadata, Assets (images, audios and videos) and Scripts that enable interactivity.

Issue Publisher: A web-based publishing platform that includes content management and aggregation features that can synchronize content from RSS feed, social media and product feeds from e-commerce platforms.

Press and awards

 Winner of Mobile Futures Australia
 10 Startups to watch in Cebit Australia

References

Online publishing companies of the United States
Mass media companies established in 2012
Technology companies established in 2012
Online companies of Australia